Theoneta is a genus of spiders in the family Linyphiidae. It was first described in 1991 by Eskov & Yuri Marusik.

Species
, it contains 2 species.
Theoneta aterrima (Eskov & Marusik, 1991) – Russia (north-eastern Siberia to Far East)
Theoneta saaristoi (Eskov & Marusik, 1991) – Russia (north-eastern Siberia, Far East)

References

Linyphiidae
Araneomorphae genera
Spiders of Russia